The 1903 Albany College football team represented Albany College during the 1903 college football season. The team beat Oregon Agricultural. The team also beat Linfield.

Schedule

References

Albany College
Lewis & Clark Pioneers football seasons
Albany College football